Oxalis ausensis is a species of plant in the family Oxalidaceae. It is endemic to Namibia.  Its natural habitat is cold desert.

References

Flora of Namibia
ausensis
Least concern plants
Taxonomy articles created by Polbot